Kinloch Hourn is a small settlement at the end of Loch Hourn, in the West Highlands of Scotland. The name comes from the Gaelic, Ceann Loch Shubhairne, for "the head of Loch Hourn".

From Kinloch Hourn, a path continues along the south side of the loch to Barrisdale. The path then climbs over Màm Barrisdale, before dropping down to the village of Inverie in Knoydart. This route once had a number of townships along it, and may have been used as a coffin road. This is also used as a walking route into the mountains of Knoydart, including Ladhar Bheinn and Luinne Bheinn.

To the north of Loch Hourn is the route of an old drove road, which ran between Kinloch Hourn to Glenelg.

References

Villages in Highland (council area)